Greg Hall (born 30 June 1980 in London, England) is a British film director, producer, cinematographer and screenwriter.

Career

2004-2014
The Plague (2004) — made when he was a 22-year-old with a budget of just £3,500 — was Hall's feature debut, winning him the inaugural Katrin Cartlidge Foundation Award at the 10th Sarajevo Film Festival. He went on to collaborate with composer Steve Martland on follow-up feature Kapital (2007).  Hall also wrote the screenplays for both of these films and was cinematographer for short film The Housewife (2005), which starred Alison Steadman.

In 2013, Hall created the film Communion, starring Paul Martin, about a vicar on the run who strikes up an unlikely friendship with a young punk traveler. A road journey of substance and fruitful rewards, actor Paul Martin stars in this highly acclaimed and beautifully made film. In 2014, he directed heist thriller Dangerous Mind of a Hooligan.

2020-present
In 2020, he released R.I.P Audrey, a short film he made with his daughter during the lockdowns of COVID-19. That same year, Villain, written and produced by Hall and starring Craig Fairbrass and George Russo, was released. In 2021, he co-wrote Baby Boy with Russo, who went on to win the Best Actor award at the 2021 British Urban Film Festival.

Filmography

(Feature films, 60 minutes and over, are listed in bold)

References and notes

External links

Broke But Making Films Brokebutmakingfilms.com
theblogfilm: Greg Hall Guardian.co.uk
Kapital (official website) KapitalFilm.com
The Plague (official website) ThePlagueFilm.co.uk
SSDD: Same Shit Different Day (official website) SSDDfilm.co.uk

1980 births
Living people
British film directors